Accounting Technicians Ireland is the leading professional body for Accounting Technicians on the island of Ireland.  They have over 10,000 members and students in the Republic of Ireland and in Northern Ireland.

The organisation was established in 1983.

Accounting Technicians Ireland is a non-profit organisation.  They are a partner body of Chartered Accountants Ireland and an associate member of the International Federation of Accountants (IFAC). They have offices in Dublin and Belfast and links with local college networks throughout Ireland.

Accounting Technicians Ireland is the trading name for the Institute of Accounting Technicians in Ireland Limited.

Qualifications
The Accounting Technicians Ireland qualification combines professional exams with practical work experience. The Accounting Technicians Ireland diploma is divided into two parts, each of which is a qualification in its own right:
 Certificate for Accounting Technicians (1 year)
 Diploma for Accounting Technicians (2 years)

The certificate and diploma are National Framework of Qualifications Level 6 qualifications. The certificate and diploma are recognised as Qualifications and Credit Framework(QCF) level 4 and level 5 qualifications, respectively, in the UK.

Students study for the ATI qualifications full or part-time (normally as part of an apprenticeship with an accountant or company) through a college, or since 2008, directly with the ATI.

Members of the Accounting Technicians Ireland body are entitled to use the letters MIATI after their name.  After eight years, members may be eligible to apply for fellow membership, who use the designation FIATI after their name. Other professional accountancy bodies recognise the qualification and offer exemptions from their examinations to Accounting Technicians Ireland graduates.

Students who complete the diploma can transfer to third year of some business, accounting, and finance degrees in DBS, IPA, Institute of Technology, Sligo, Waterford Institute of Technology, and CIT.

History

Organisational structure
Accounting Technicians Ireland is managed and operated by a board of directors and 26 executive staff.  The board of directors is made up of eight directors and a secretary.  Four directors are elected members, and the others  are nominated by their partner body, Chartered Accountants Ireland.

Working under senior management the following departments support students' and members' needs:
Member Services
Education
IT
Finance 
Marketing

Professional standards
Accounting Technicians Ireland has a code of professional ethics and a set of disciplinary procedures, the purpose of which is to ensure confidence in the organisation and its members.

Membership structure
Accounting Technicians Ireland has four levels of membership.
 Student Members: all who have enrolled in an Accounting Technicians Ireland course and have yet to finish their final exams are classified as Student Members.
 Affiliate Members: Affiliate membership is open to all who have passed the Accounting Technicians Ireland exams but do not yet have the two years work experience required to complete the qualification and become Full members.  Students can proceed straight to full membership once they pass their exams, if they have already gathered the required two years of relevant work experience. They are not required to become Affiliate Members first.
 Full Members (MIATI): a Full Member of Accounting Technicians Ireland is someone who has completed the Diploma for Accounting Technicians qualification. They will have passed all their exams, completed at least two years approved work experience within an accounting or finance environment, and have been conferred at a graduation ceremony. They are entitled to use the professional letters MIATI after their name.
 Fellow Members (FIATI): Fellow membership is open to anyone who has been a Full member of Accounting Technicians Ireland for eight years and has at least five years' experience of working in a senior position within their employment. They are entitled to use the professional letters FIATI to differentiate their senior experience and expertise within the accounting profession.

Providers
As well as the ATI itself, a number of Schools and College provide Accounting Technician Ireland Training Programmes.
 Northern Regional College, Ballymena, Coleraine & Magherafelt.
 Belfast Metropolitan College, Belfast.
 North West Regional College, Derry, Omagh and Limavady
 Cavan Institute, Cavan Town, Co. Cavan
 Cork College of Commerce, Cork City
 Cork Institute of Technology, Bishopstown, Co. Cork.
 Mallow College of Further Education, Mallow, Co. Cork.
 Blackrock Further Education Institute Blackrock, Co. Dublin. 
 Coláiste Íde College of Further Education, Finglas, Dublin.
 Plunket College of Further Education, Whitehall, Dublin.
 Rathmines College of Further Education, Rathmines, Dublin
 Galway-Mayo Institute of Technology
 Portarlington Adult Education Centre, Portarlington, Co. Laois.
 Dundalk Institute of Technology, Dundalk, Co. Louth.
 Beaufort College, Navan, Co. Meath.
 Monaghan Institute, Monaghan, Co. Monaghan
 Mullingar Community College, Mullingar, Co. Westmeath.

See also
 Certified Accounting Technician - offered by the Association of Chartered Certified Accountants(ACCA)
 Association of Accounting Technicians - UK Accounting Technicians

References

External links
Official website
The Institute of Chartered Accountants in Ireland (ICAI) – official website

Ireland
Learned societies of Ireland
1983 establishments in Ireland
Professional associations based in Ireland
All-Ireland organisations
Accounting in Ireland